This is a complete list of seasons competed by the Winnipeg Blue Bombers, a Canadian Football League team.  While the team was founded in 1930, they did not join the CFL until it was founded in 1958.  Throughout their history, the Blue Bombers have won 12 Grey Cups. They are also the only team in the West Division to have faced off with their fellow West opponents in a Grey Cup, beating BC and Edmonton.

Winnipeg Blue Bombers lists